Paddy O'Donoghue may refer to:

 Paddy O'Donoghue (Gaelic footballer), Gaelic footballer and selector
 Paddy O'Donoghue (rugby union), former Irish rugby union international